Ruby Creek may refer to:

Canada
 Ruby Creek (Fraser River tributary), in British Columbia
 Ruby Creek (Lake Surprise), a tributary in the Atlin Country region of British Columbia
 Ruby Creek, British Columbia, a locality on the Fraser River
 Ruby Creek Indian Reserve No. 2, in British Columbia

United States
 Ruby Creek (Michigan), a tributary of the Pere Marquette river
 Ruby Creek (Montana), a stream in Flathead County, Montana
 Ruby Creek (South Dakota)
 Ruby Creek (Washington), a tributary of the Skagit River